Events in the year 2017 in Croatia.

Incumbents
 President – Kolinda Grabar-Kitarović 
 Prime Minister – Andrej Plenković
 Speaker – Božo Petrov (until 5 May), Gordan Jandroković (from 5 May)

Events
10 April – Ivica Todorić steps down as Agrokor's Chairman of the Board amid the company's financial problems
21 May – Croatian local elections, 2017
 29 November – Upon hearing the guilty verdict upheld in November 2017, Slobodan Praljak stated that he rejected the verdict of the court, and committed suicide by poisoning in the ICTY courtroom in the Hague.

Deaths

3 January – Ivo Brešan, writer (b. 1936).
2 February – Predrag Matvejević, writer and political activist (b. 1932).
17 February – Marko Veselica, politician and economist (b. 1936)
1 March – Vladimir Tadej, film director (b. 1925)
7 April – Relja Bašić, actor (b. 1930)
21 July – Hrvoje Šarinić, politician (b. 1935)
3 August – Bonaventura Duda, Franciscan friar (b. 1924)
19 November – Milan Moguš, linguist (b. 1927)

References

 
2010s in Croatia
Years of the 21st century in Croatia
Croatia
Croatia